The 1994 State of Origin series saw the 13th year that the annual three-game series between the Queensland and New South Wales representative rugby league football teams was contested entirely under 'state of origin' selection rules. Mark Coyne's completion of a miraculous team effort by Queensland to snatch victory in the dying seconds of Game I has become a featured moment in Origin folklore. In Game II a crowd of 87,000 flocked to the MCG setting a new Australian rugby league crowd record. In Game III New South Wales won their first ever Lang Park decider, spoiling Mal Meninga's farewell Origin match.


Game I

For 75 minutes New South Wales were the better side and led 12-4 as a trickle of spectators began to make an early exit to beat the traffic. Those that left missed one of the greatest rugby league miracles of all time. With five minutes to go Willie Carne scored for Queensland reaching over his head to take a pass from centre Mark Coyne. Maroons captain Mal Meninga kicked the conversion but the Blues defence rallied from the kick-off and they kept the Queenslanders pinned in their own quarter as the clock ticked down.

With 60 seconds remaining and trailing 12-10 Queensland launched one last attacking wave from deep inside their own half. Halfback Allan Langer initiated the play, firing a long ball to Kevin Walters. The five-eighth passed to Willie Carne, whose overhead pass released Steve Renouf. The Test centre raced up-field as suddenly the tension rose.

The Maroons threw a rapid-fire series of chain passes spanning the breadth of the SFS. The Blues' defence gathered in numbers but as each Queensland player met a tackler he would find another man at his outside shoulder. Renouf, Michael Hancock, Darren Smith, Langer and Mal Meninga all handled and suddenly Mark Coyne was accepting a pass metres out as Brad Fittler and Ricky Stuart tried in vain to bring Coyne down only to see him slide to the line, reach out and score.

Television commentator Ray Warren famously exclaimed, "That's not a try—that's a miracle!" Fittler buried his head in the turf, Stuart in frustration kicked the corner post sky-high and the New South Wales crowd were plunged into deathly silence with 32 seconds left on the clock and the game gone.

Game II
The Blues headed to the Melbourne Cricket Ground full of confidence but with a game plan dictated by coach Phil Gould to play it tight and close despite the massive crowd of novice Melburnian rugby league followers hoping to see a flowing spectacle. The MCG attendance of 87,161 was the highest ever for a rugby league match in Australia.

Ben Elias laid on the first try, confusing Queensland with some sleight of hand and picking up prop Glenn Lazarus on the burst. With two goals from their fullback Tim Brasher, New South Wales led 8-0 at half-time due to their steely defence and mistake-free football. The Blues wrapped up the match when centre Paul "Mary" McGregor accepted a reverse pass from Stuart and strolled through to clinch a 14-0 win.

Game III
New South Wales arrived at Lang Park for game III having never won a decider there to claim a series. The Queensland crowd's sentiment was focussed on farewelling their hero Mal Meninga in his last Origin and record 38th appearance in a Queensland jumper.

New South Wales built an early lead with tries to the Canberra trio of Bradley Clyde, Laurie Daley and Brett Mullins who along with half-back Ricky Stuart were out to spoil the occasion for their club captain and friend Meninga. Queensland's nervousness supplied two vital intercepts to allow the tries. The first was taken by hooker Ben Elias off Langer and quickly given to Clyde who scored. The second came when Steve Renouf threw a diabolical pass towards winger Willie Carne. Mullins, then one of the fastest men in the game swooped on the ball and raced 40 metres to score. Daley chipped in with his own gilt-edged contribution, a try in which he sidestepped and swerved his way past five would-be tacklers from 15 metres out.

A try to Queensland forward Andrew Gee cut the lead back to 18-6 at the break. With serious injuries suffered by Jason Smith and Willie Carne there was to be no trademark Queensland revival. Smith suffered a broken jaw following a head clash with Ian Roberts and Carne was carried from the field on a stretcher. Elias kicked a field-goal in the second-half give New South Wales a comfortable buffer even after Steve Renouf's try made the score 19-12 after 55 minutes. In what would be his own final Origin match after 19 career appearances Elias booted the second of three field goals two minutes from full-time, ensuring at least his farewell rather than Mal Meninga's, would be a victor's.

It was a courageous series effort by New South Wales who for the first time in their Origin history came back from a Game I loss to clinch the series and for the first time ever claimed three successive series victories.

New South Wales squad

Queensland squad

See also
 1994 NSWRL season

Sources
 Big League's 25 Years of Origin Collectors' Edition, News Magazines, Surry Hills, Sydney
 Chesterton, Ray (1996) Good as Gould, Ironbark, Sydney

References

External links
 1994 State of Origin at sportsphotography.net

State of Origin series
State of Origin series